"Jam" is a song by American singer-songwriter Michael Jackson, released as the fourth single from his eight album, Dangerous (1991), where it is the opening track. It also appears as the second track on his 2009 This Is It compilation album. The single was re-released in 2006 as part of Jackson's Visionary: The Video Singles collection campaign, and it was remixed to the Cirque du Soleil's Immortal World Tour, releasing that remix on the soundtrack album. "Jam" is a new jack swing song whose bridge features a rap verse performed by Heavy D (of the group Heavy D & the Boyz), though no credit to him appears on the album. The music video of the song featured NBA basketball legend Michael Jordan. The song was also featured on the Chicago Bulls (Jordan's team at the time)'s 1992 NBA Championship video "Untouchabulls" and was also used in many promotional ads of the NBA in the said season. The single peaked at #26 on the Billboard Hot 100. The song re-entered the UK Singles Chart in 2006, reaching number 22.

Critical reception
"Jam" was generally well received by music critics. Larry Flick from Billboard wrote that the song "is fortified with brassy horns, a funky bass line, and a rap cameo by Heavy D. Jackson's signature squeals and whoops are at home within an urgent groove that seems to goad him to the point of catharsis." Pan-European magazine Music & Media commented, "Get in the groove with the most funky track on the Dangerous album." An editor from People Magazine felt that Jackson "captures the outer style but not the energizing spirit of hip-hop." 

Alan Light from Rolling Stone praised the song, adding that it "addresses Jackson's uneasy relationship to the world and reveals a canny self-awareness that carries the strongest message on Dangerous." He wrote further, "Though it initially sounds like a simple, funky dance vehicle, Jackson's voice bites into each phrase with a desperation that urges us to look deeper. He is singing as "false prophets cry of doom" and exhorts us to "live each day like it's the last." The chorus declares that the miseries of the world "ain't too much stuff" to stop us from jamming. To Jackson, who insists that he comes truly alive only onstage, the ability to "Jam" is the sole means to find "peace within myself," and this hope rings more sincere than the childlike wishes found in the ballads." Ted Shaw from The Windsor Star noted that Jackson's voice is treated electronically on the track, "which establishes the thematic thrust in lyrics that call for brotherly love."

Retrospective response
In an 2016 retrospective review, Chris Lacy from Albumism said that on the song, Jackson "explains that jamming (the joy of music and dance) is his preferred method of temporarily escaping worldly issues." AllMusic editor Stephen Thomas Erlewine wrote that there's a lot to be said for professional craftsmanship at its peak and he called this song blistering plus highlight on album. Adam Gilham of Sputnikmusic described the song as a perfect album opener and rated it "5/5".

Music video
The accompanying music video for "Jam" takes place within an abandoned indoor basketball court, where Michael Jackson teaches basketball legend Michael Jordan how to dance, and in return, Jordan teaches Jackson how to play basketball. Special effects have Jackson throwing a basketball through a window and scoring in the hoop in the opposite room, as well as Jackson scoring by tossing the ball behind him and kicking the ball into the hoop with his heel. The extended versions of the video include Jackson teaching Jordan how to do the physically complicated moonwalk dance technique (known as the slide step). The rap groups Kris Kross and Naughty by Nature made a cameo appearance, as does Heavy D (who performs a rap during the bridge).

The video was included on Dangerous – The Short Films and Michael Jackson's Vision. The music video was directed by David Kellogg and was filmed on April 20, 1992, in Chicago, Illinois. The music video premiered on FOX on June 19, 1992, at 9:30 p.m. EST.

Live performances
Jackson performed "Jam" as the opening number throughout his Dangerous World Tour. He also performed it at the Royal Brunei Concert in 1996, which turned out to be the last live performance of the song. A portion of the song was performed at the start of the 1993 Super Bowl halftime show. The song was prepared for the This Is It concert series, with a snippet of "Another Part of Me", however the shows were cancelled due to Jackson's untimely death and it is not known if it were to have made the final setlist.

Track listings and formats
 Jam (UK CD single 6583602)
 "Jam" (7" Edit) – 4:10
 "Jam" (Roger's Jeep Mix) – 5:54 
 "Jam" (Atlanta Techno Dub) – 5:16 (Incorrectly listed on insert as "Atlantan Techno Mix")
 "Wanna Be Startin' Somethin'" (Brothers in Rhythm House Mix) – 7:40

 Jam (US CD single 49K74334)
 "Jam" (Roger's Jeep Radio Mix) – 3:57 
 "Jam" (Silky 7" Mix) – 4:17
 "Jam" (Roger's Club Mix) – 6:20 
 "Jam" (Atlanta Techno Mix) – 6:06
 "Rock with You" (Masters at Work Remix) – 5:29

 Jam (US promo CD single ESK6754)
 "Jam" (Roger's Jeep Radio Mix) – 3:57 
 "Jam" (Teddy's Jam) – 5:48
 "Jam" (7" Edit) – 4:10
 "Jam" (MJ's Raw Mix) – 4:24 
 "Jam" (Teddy's 12" Mix) – 5:42
 "Jam" (Roger's Jeep Mix) – 5:54
 "Jam" (Percapella) – 5:29
 "Jam" (Radio Edit Without Rap) – 4:44

 Jam (US VHS promo single ESK8880)
 "Jam" (music video) – 8:00
Running time: 9 minutes

 Jam (2006 DualDisc single ESK4583)
CD side
 "Jam" (7" Edit) – 4:10
 "Jam" (Silky 12" Mix) – 6:28

DVD side
 "Jam" (music video) – 8:00

Personnel

 Song and lyrics by Michael Jackson
 Music by René Moore, Bruce Swedien, Michael Jackson and Teddy Riley
 Produced by Michael Jackson, Teddy Riley and Bruce Swedien
 Solo and background vocals by Michael Jackson
 Recorded and mixed by Bruce Swedien, Teddy Riley and Dave Way
 Arrangement by Michael Jackson, Bruce Swedien, Teddy Riley and René Moore

 Vocal arrangement by Michael Jackson
 Rap performed by Heavy D
 Rene Moore, Teddy Riley, Bruce Swedien and Brad Buxer: Keyboards
 Teddy Riley, Rhett Lawrence, Michael Boddicker and Brad Buxer: Synthesizers
 Teddy Riley and Bruce Swedien: Drums
 Teddy Riley: Guitar

Charts

Weekly charts

Year-end charts

References

1992 singles
Michael Jackson songs
Songs written by Michael Jackson
Songs written by René Moore
Song recordings produced by Teddy Riley
Michael Jordan
Basketball music
Song recordings produced by Michael Jackson
Songs written by Teddy Riley
Songs written by Bruce Swedien
1991 songs
Epic Records singles
Number-one singles in Spain